Julian Allen (1942–1998) was a British-American illustrator. He covered various "secret history" stories, including the Watergate scandal and the Yom Kippur War. His illustrations appeared in numerous publications, including Queen, NOVA, Esquire, The Observer, Sports Illustrated, The New Yorker, Time, and The New York Times.

Biography
Born in Cambridge, England in 1942, Allen studied at the Central School of Art and Design in London.

In 1973, Allen moved to the United States on the invitations of Clay Felker and Milton Glaser. Glaser later said that they had found Allen while trying to "find an illustrator whose journalistic interest and talent would permit us to do unusual visual reportage". Allen taught at the Parson's School of Design for more than 20 years. In 1997, Allen became the Illustration Chair of the Maryland Institute College of Art, where he integrated professionalism into the artistry curriculum.

Allen died in September 1998 of non-Hodgkin's lymphoma.

References 

1942 births
1998 deaths
British emigrants to the United States
English illustrators
American illustrators
Maryland Institute College of Art faculty
Parsons School of Design faculty